This is a list of Brazilian films released in 1942.

See also
 1942 in Brazil

References

1942
Films
Brazilian